Iwetemlaykin State Heritage Site, a public park in the U.S. state of Oregon, is on the south edge of Joseph, along Oregon Route 351. Its name comes from the Nez Perce place name, Iwetemlaykin (pronounced ee-weh-TEMM-lye-kinn), which means "at the edge of the lake". The park, near Wallowa Lake, is adjacent to one of the 38 sites of the Nez Perce National Historical Park, the site of the Old Chief Joseph grave and cemetery.

Park amenities include a walking trail, Knight's pond, wildlife watching, native plants, views of the Wallowa Mountains, parking, and a restroom.

See also
List of Oregon state parks
Nez Perce Traditional Site, Wallowa Lake

References

External links
 Park brochure

2009 establishments in Oregon
Parks in Wallowa County, Oregon
Protected areas established in 2009
State parks of Oregon
Joseph, Oregon